The Appeal to Conscience is a 1949 German mystery film directed by Karl Anton and starring Karl Ludwig Diehl, Werner Hinz and Gustav Diessl. It was originally shot in 1944, but remained uncompleted until it was finished by DEFA in the post-war era. It remained unreleased until it was given a 1949 premiere in Austria. Subsequently it was distributed in East Germany in 1950 and West Germany in 1951.

It was produced by Tobis Film, one of the dominant companies of the Nazi era. It was shot in Studios in German-occupied Prague, with some location filming taking place around the city. The film's sets were designed by the art director Gustav A. Knauer.

It involves the solving of a murder case re-opened ten years after it occurred by a celebrated crime writer.

Cast
 Karl Ludwig Diehl as Kriminalrat Husfeld
 Werner Hinz as Volkmar Hollberg, Schrifsteller
 Gustav Diessl as Dr. Gregor Karpinski
 Käthe Haack as Helga Andree
 Marina von Ditmar as Ingrid Andree
 Anneliese Uhlig as Senora de la Serna
 Andrews Engelmann as Jan Puchalla
 Hilde Hildebrand as Meta Puchalla
 Harald Paulsen as Korfiz
 Elisabeth Markus as Frau Hamborn
 Herbert Hübner as Gröner
 Hans Stiebner as Wituschek
 Walter Janssen
 Karl Hannemann
 Walter Werner
 Siegfried Niemann
 Anneliese von Eschstruth
 Werner Pledath

See also
 Überläufer

References

Bibliography
 Davidson, John & Hake, Sabine. Framing the Fifties: Cinema in a Divided Germany. Berghahn Books, 2007.

External links 
 

1949 films
1949 mystery films
German mystery films
East German films
West German films
1940s German-language films
Films directed by Karl Anton
Tobis Film films
German black-and-white films
1940s German films